Xiomara Larios (born 15 November 1958) is a Nicaraguan sprinter. She competed in the women's 400 metres at the 1980 Summer Olympics.

References

1958 births
Living people
Athletes (track and field) at the 1980 Summer Olympics
Nicaraguan female sprinters
Olympic athletes of Nicaragua
Place of birth missing (living people)
Central American Games bronze medalists for Nicaragua
Central American Games medalists in athletics
Olympic female sprinters